Ali II was twelfth Shah of Shirvan, ruling from 1034 to 1043.

Reign
He continued to fight against Derbent rulers. In 1035, he made his sister Shamkuya marry the Hashimid ruler of Derbent, Abd al-Malik ibn Mansur, thus making peace with them. Ali II later died in 1043 and was succeeded by his younger brother Kubad.

References

11th-century rulers in Asia
11th-century Iranian people
1043 deaths